In the psychology of human behavior, denialism is a person's choice to deny reality as a way to avoid a psychologically uncomfortable truth. Denialism is an essentially irrational action that withholds the validation of a historical experience or event when a person refuses to accept an empirically verifiable reality.

In the sciences, denialism is the rejection of basic facts and concepts that are undisputed, well-supported parts of the scientific consensus on a subject, in favor of ideas that are radical, controversial, or fabricated. The terms Holocaust denial and AIDS denialism describe the denial of the facts and the reality of the subject matters, and the term climate change denial describes denial of the scientific consensus that the climate change of planet Earth is a real and occurring event primarily caused in geologically recent times by human activity. The forms of denialism present the common feature of the person rejecting overwhelming evidence and trying to generate political controversy in attempts to deny the existence of consensus.

The motivations and causes of denialism include religion, self-interest (economic, political, or financial), and defence mechanisms meant to protect the psyche of the denialist against mentally disturbing facts and ideas; such disturbance is called cognitive dissonance in psychology terms.

Definition and tactics
Anthropologist Didier Fassin distinguishes between denial, defined as "the empirical observation that reality and truth are being denied", and denialism, which he defines as "an ideological position whereby one systematically reacts by refusing reality and truth". Persons and social groups who reject propositions on which there exists a mainstream and scientific consensus engage in denialism when they use rhetorical tactics to give the appearance of argument and legitimate debate, when there is none. It is a process that operates by employing one or more of the following five tactics to maintain the appearance of legitimate controversy:

 Conspiracy theories – Dismissing the data or observation by suggesting opponents are involved in "a conspiracy to suppress the truth".
 Cherry picking – Selecting an anomalous critical paper supporting their idea, or using outdated, flawed, and discredited papers to make their opponents look as though they base their ideas on weak research. Diethelm and McKee (2009) note, "Denialists are usually not deterred by the extreme isolation of their theories, but rather see it as an indication of their intellectual courage against the dominant orthodoxy and the accompanying political correctness."
 False experts – Paying an expert in the field, or another field, to lend supporting evidence or credibility. This goes hand-in-hand with the marginalization of real experts and researchers.
 Moving the goalposts – Dismissing evidence presented in response to a specific claim by continually demanding some other (often unfulfillable) piece of evidence (aka Shifting baseline)
 Other logical fallacies – Usually one or more of false analogy, appeal to consequences, straw man, or red herring.

Common tactics to different types of denialism include misrepresenting evidence, false equivalence, half-truths, and outright fabrication. South African judge Edwin Cameron notes that a common tactic used by denialists is to "make great play of the inescapable indeterminacy of figures and statistics". Historian Taner Akçam states that denialism is commonly believed to be negation of facts, but in fact "it is in that nebulous territory between facts and truth where such denialism germinates. Denialism marshals its own facts and it has its own truth."

Focusing on the rhetorical tactics through which denialism is achieved in language, in Alex Gillespie (2020) of the London School of Economics has reviewed the linguistic and practical defensive tactics for denying disruptive information. These tactics are conceptualized in terms of three layers of defence:
 Avoiding – The first line of defence against disruptive information is to avoid it.
 Delegitimizing – The second line of defence is to attack the messenger, by undermining the credibility of the source.
 Limiting – The final line of defence, if disruptive information cannot be avoided or delegitimized, is to rationalize and limit the impact of the disruptive ideas.

In 2009 author Michael Specter defined group denialism as "when an entire segment of society, often struggling with the trauma of change, turns away from reality in favor of a more comfortable lie".

Prescriptive and polemic perspectives
If one party to a debate accuses the other of denialism they are framing the debate. This is because an accusation of denialism is both prescriptive and polemic: prescriptive because it carries implications that there is truth to the denied claim; polemic since the accuser implies that continued denial in the light of presented evidence raises questions about the other's motives. Edward Skidelsky, a lecturer in philosophy at Exeter University writes that "An accusation of 'denial' is serious, suggesting either deliberate dishonesty or self-deception. The thing being denied is, by implication, so obviously true that the denier must be driven by perversity, malice or wilful blindness." He suggests that, by the introduction of the word denier into further areas of historical and scientific debate, "One of the great achievements of The Enlightenmentthe liberation of historical and scientific enquiry from dogmais quietly being reversed".

Some people have suggested that because denial of the Holocaust is well known, advocates who use the term denialist in other areas of debate may intentionally or unintentionally imply that their opponents are little better than Holocaust deniers. However, Robert Gallo et al. defended this latter comparison, stating that AIDS denialism is similar to Holocaust denial since it is a form of pseudoscience that "contradicts an immense body of research".

Current examples

HIV/AIDS 

AIDS denialism is the denial that the human immunodeficiency virus (HIV) is the cause of acquired immune deficiency syndrome (AIDS). AIDS denialism has been described as being "among the most vocal anti-science denial movements". Some denialists reject the existence of HIV, while others accept that the virus exists but say that it is a harmless passenger virus and not the cause of AIDS. Insofar as denialists acknowledge AIDS as a real disease, they attribute it to some combination of recreational drug use, malnutrition, poor sanitation, and side effects of antiretroviral medication, rather than infection with HIV. However, the evidence that HIV causes AIDS is scientifically conclusive and the scientific community rejects and ignores AIDS-denialist claims as based on faulty reasoning, cherry picking, and misrepresentation of mainly outdated scientific data. With the rejection of these arguments by the scientific community, AIDS-denialist material is now spread mainly through the Internet.

Thabo Mbeki, former president of South Africa, embraced AIDS denialism, proclaiming that AIDS was primarily caused by poverty. About 365,000 people died from AIDS during his presidency; it is estimated that around 343,000 premature deaths could have been prevented if proper treatment had been available.

Climate change 

Some international corporations, such as ExxonMobil, have contributed to "fake citizens' groups and bogus scientific bodies" that claim that the science of global warming is inconclusive, according to a criticism by George Monbiot. ExxonMobil did not deny making the financial contributions, but its spokesman stated that the company's financial support for scientific reports did not mean it influenced the outcome of those studies. Newsweek and Mother Jones have published articles stating corporations are funding the "denial industry".

In the context of consumer protection, denialism has been defined as "the use of rhetorical techniques and predictable tactics to erect barriers to debate and consideration of any type of reform, regardless of the facts." The Bush Administration's replacement of previous science advisers with industry experts or scientists tied to the industry, and its refusal to submit the Kyoto Protocol for ratification due to uncertainties they asserted were present in the climate change issue, have been cited by the press as examples of politically motivated denialism.

COVID-19 

The term "COVID-19 denialism" or merely "COVID denialism" refers to the thinking of those who deny the reality of the COVID-19 pandemic, at least to the extent of denying the scientifically recognized COVID mortality data of the World Health Organization. The claims that the COVID-19 pandemic has been faked, exaggerated, or mischaracterized are pseudoscience. Some famous people who have engaged in COVID-19 denialism include Elon Musk, former U.S. President Donald Trump, and Brazilian President Bolsonaro.

Evolution 

Religious beliefs may prompt an individual to deny the validity of the scientific theory of evolution. Evolution is considered an undisputed fact within the scientific community and in academia, where the level of support for evolution is essentially universal, yet this view is often met with opposition by biblical literalists. The alternative view is often presented as a literal interpretation of the Book of Genesis's creation myth. Many fundamentalist Christians teach creationism as if it were fact under the banners of creation science and intelligent design. Beliefs that typically coincide with creationism include the belief in the global flood myth, geocentrism, and the belief that the Earth is only 6,000–10,000 years old. These beliefs are viewed as pseudoscience in the scientific community and are widely regarded as erroneous.

Flat Earth 

The superseded belief that the Earth is flat, and denial of all of the overwhelming evidence that supports an approximately spherical Earth that rotates around its axis and orbits the Sun, persists into the 21st century. Modern proponents of flat-Earth cosmology (or flat-Earthers) refuse to accept any kind of contrary evidence, dismissing all spaceflights and images from space as hoaxes and accusing all organizations and even private citizens of conspiring to "hide the truth". They also claim that no actual satellites are orbiting the Earth, that the International Space Station is fake, and that these are lies from all governments involved in this grand cover-up. Some even believe other planets and stars are hoaxes.

Adherents of the modern flat-Earth model propose that a dome-shaped firmament encloses a disk-shaped Earth. Modern flat-Earthers believe that Antarctica is not a continent but a massive ice floe, with a wall  or higher, which circles the perimeter of the Earth and keeps everything (including all the oceans' water) from falling off the edge.

Flat-Earthers also assert that no one is allowed to fly over or explore Antarctica, despite contrary evidence. According to them, all photos and videos of ships sinking under the horizon and of the bottoms of city skylines and clouds below the horizon, revealing the curvature of the Earth, have been manipulated, computer-generated, or somehow faked. Therefore, regardless of any scientific or empirical evidence provided, flat-Earthers conclude that it is fabricated or altered in some way.

When linked to other observed phenomena such as gravity, sunsets, tides, eclipses, distances and other measurements that challenge the flat earth model, claimants replace commonly-accepted explanations with piecemeal models that distort or over-simplify how perspective, mass, buoyancy, light or other physical systems work. These piecemeal replacements rarely conform with each other, finally leaving many flat-Earth claimants to agree that such phenomena remain "mysteries" and more investigation is to be done. In this conclusion, adherents remain open to all explanations except the commonly accepted globular Earth model, shifting the debate from ignorance to denialism.

Genetically modified foods 

There is a scientific consensus that currently available food derived from GM crops poses no greater risk to human health than conventional food, but that each GM food needs to be tested on a case-by-case basis before introduction. Nonetheless, members of the public are much less likely than scientists to perceive GM foods as safe. The legal and regulatory status of GM foods varies by country, with some nations banning or restricting them, and others permitting them with widely differing degrees of regulation.

However, opponents have objected to GM foods on grounds including safety. Psychological analyses indicate that over 70% of GM food opponents in the US are "absolute" in their opposition, experience disgust at the thought of eating GM foods, and are "evidence insensitive".

Statins 
Statin denialism is a rejection of the medical worth of statins. Cardiologist Steven Nissen at Cleveland Clinic has commented "We are losing the battle for the hearts and minds of our patients to Web sites..." promoting unproven medical therapies. Harriet Hall sees a spectrum of "statin denialism" ranging from pseudoscientific claims to the understatement of benefits and overstatement of side effects, all of which is contrary to the scientific evidence.

Mental illness denial 

Mental illness denial or mental disorder denial is where a person denies the existence of mental disorders. Both serious analysts, as well as pseudoscientific movements question the existence of certain disorders. A minority of professional researchers see disorders such as depression from a sociocultural perspective and argue that the solution to it is fixing a dysfunction in society, not in the person's brain. Some people may also deny that they have a mental illness after being diagnosed, certain analysts argue this denialism is usually fueled by narcissistic injury. Anti-psychiatry movements such as Scientology promote mental illness denial by having alternative practices to psychiatry.

Election denial 
Election denial is false dismissal of the outcome of a fair election.  Stacey Abrams denied the 2018 election for governor in Georgia was "a free and fair election" and spent $22 million in "largely unsuccessful" litigation.  In the United States during 2022, there is an ongoing stolen election conspiracy theory about the 2020 presidential election.

Historical examples

Armenian genocide denialism

Holocaust denialism 

Holocaust denial refers to denial of the murder of 5 to 6 million Jews by the Nazis in Europe during World War 2. It is an essentially irrational action that withholds validation of a historical experience or event." In this context, the term is a subset of the more accurate genocide denial, which is a form of politically motivated denialism.

Nakba denialism 
Nakba denial refers to attempts to downgrade, deny and misdescribe the ethnic cleansing of Palestinians during the Nakba.
 in which four-fifths of all Palestinians were driven off their lands and into exile.

Srebrenica massacre denialism 

Sonja Biserko, president of the Helsinki Committee for Human Rights in Serbia, and Edina Bečirević, the Faculty of Criminalistics, Criminology and Security Studies of the University of Sarajevo have pointed to a culture of denial of the Srebrenica massacre in Serbian society, taking many forms and present in particular in political discourse, the media, the law and the educational system.

See also

 
 
 
 
 
 
 
 
 
 
 Pseudoskepticism

Notes

References

Works cited

Further reading

Articles
 
 
 Oreskes, Naomi, "History Matters to Science: It helps to explain how cynical actors undermine the truth", Scientific American, vol. 323, no. 6 (December 2020), p. 81. "In our 2010 book, Merchants of Doubt, Erik M. Conway and I showed how the same arguments [as those used to cast doubt on the link between tobacco use and lung cancer] were used to delay action on acid rain, the ozone hole and climate change – and this year [2020] we saw the spurious "freedom" argument being used to disparage mask wearing [during the COVID-19 pandemic]."

Books

External links

 Denialism Blog
 "Refusing Flu Shots? Maybe You're A 'Denialist'" National Public Radio

 
Barriers to critical thinking
Cognitive dissonance
Politics by issue
Propaganda techniques
Public relations techniques
Science in society